Vale TV (Valores Educativos Televisión) (formerly a public-owned educational channel in Venezuela called Televisora Nacional) is a television channel run by Asociación Civil, a non-profit association owned by the Roman Catholic Archbishopric of Caracas (Arzobispado de Caracas), supported by the leading private television networks Radio Caracas Televisión, Venevisión, and Televen along with other public and private institutions. Created on December 4, 1998, it was founded on the principle of strengthening Venezuelan morality and cultural and educational awareness.

Vale TV's slogan is "El Mundo en un solo canal".  It is seen on channel 5 in Caracas and channels 52, 10, 3, and 114 on Supercable, Intercable, Net Uno, and DirecTV, respectively.  With DirecTV, it can be seen in all of Venezuela.

Vale TV shows include (since 2006) Oscar Sambrano Urdaneta's Valores.

See also
Catholic television
Catholic television channels
Catholic television networks

References

External links
 Official website 

Television networks in Venezuela
Television stations in Venezuela
Mass media in Venezuela
Spanish-language television stations
Television channels and stations established in 1998
Mass media in Caracas